This is a list of submissions to the 88th Academy Awards for Best Foreign Language Film. The Academy of Motion Picture Arts and Sciences (AMPAS) has invited the film industries of various countries to submit their best film for the Academy Award for Best Foreign Language Film every year since the award was created in 1956. The award is presented annually by the Academy to a feature-length motion picture produced outside the United States that contains primarily non-English dialogue. The Foreign Language Film Award Committee oversees the process and reviews all the submitted films. Nine shortlisted contenders were revealed a week before the announcement of the Oscar nominations.

The submitted motion pictures must be first released theatrically in their respective countries between 1 October 2014, and 30 September 2015.

The deadline for submissions was 1 October 2015, with the Academy announcing a list of eligible films later that month.

A total of 81 countries submitted a film before the deadline, with Paraguay submitting a film for the first time with the documentary Cloudy Times, directed by Arami Ullon.

The Academy announced a list of eligible submissions in October 2015. Nine finalists from among the dozens of entries were shortlisted on 17 December. The final five nominees were announced on 14 January 2016. The winner was Hungary's Son of Saul, directed by László Nemes.

Submissions

Notes
  Afghanistan's submission was on the official list, but it was disqualified a few days prior to its Academy screening for having too much dialogue in English. The Afghan filmmakers union tried to appeal, bringing the language breakdown by minutes, but they were unsuccessful.
  China's submission was originally reported as being Wolf Totem directed by Jean-Jacques Annaud, but this was changed to Go Away Mr. Tumor by Han Yan when the final list was released.
  Cuba announced that it had convened a selection committee which decided by majority vote not to send a film to the Oscars.
  The Nigerian Oscar Selection Committee (NOSC) asked for films to be submitted by 6 July 2015. Nigeria planned to submit a film for the first time last year, but ultimately no entries were eligible.
  Panama had reportedly submitted the documentary Box 25 directed by Mercedes Arias and Delfina Vidal, but the film was not on the final list.
  Ukraine missed the deadline to submit a film, but requested an extension from the Academy.

References

External links
 Official website of the Academy Awards

2014 in film
2015 in film
88